The 2016–17 Ligue Nationale du football Amateur is the sixth season of the league under its current title and sixth season under its current league division format. A total of 48 teams will be contesting the league. The league is scheduled to start on September, 2016.

Stadiums and locations

League tables

Groupe Est

Groupe Centre

Groupe Ouest

References

Ligue Nationale du Football Amateur seasons
3
Algeria